Louis de Duras, 2nd Earl of Feversham, KG (164119 April 1709) was a French nobleman who became Earl of Feversham in Stuart England.

Born in France, he was marquis de Blanquefort and sixth son of Guy Aldonce (1605–1665), Marquis of Duras and Count of Rozan, from the noble Durfort family. His mother was Elizabeth de la Tour d'Auvergne, sister of Henri de la Tour d'Auvergne, Vicomte de Turenne.

His two brothers Jacques Henri and Guy Aldonce were Marshals of France. He was a Huguenot.

In 1663 he came to England in the suite of James, Duke of York, and was naturalized in the same year. On 19 January 1673 he was raised to the English peerage as Baron Duras, of Holdenby, his title being derived from an estate in Northamptonshire bought from the Duke of York, and in 1676 he married Mary, daughter and elder co-heir of Sir George Sondes, created in that year Baron Throwley, Viscount Sondes and Earl of Feversham.

On the death of his father-in-law in 1677, Duras succeeded to his titles under a special remainder. His wife died in 1679. He was appointed by Charles II successively to the command of the third and first troops of Horse Guards, was sent abroad on several important diplomatic missions, and became Master of the Horse (1679) and Lord Chamberlain to the queen, Catherine of Braganza (1680). In 1682 he was appointed a Lord of the Bedchamber, and was present at the king's deathbed conversion to Roman Catholicism.

When the Duke of York became King James II, Feversham became a member of the Privy Council, and in 1685 was given the chief command against the rebels under Monmouth, in which he mainly distinguished himself by his cruelty to the vanquished after the Battle of Sedgemoor. He was rewarded with a knighthood of the Garter and the colonelcy of the first troop of Life Guards, and in 1686 he was appointed to the command of the army assembled by King James on Blackheath to overawe the people.

After King James II was deposed in the Glorious Revolution, Feversham succeeded in making his peace with King William III, on the intercession of Queen Catherine, at whose instance he received the mastership of the Royal Hospital of St Katherine near the Tower (1698). According to his relation Louis de Rouvroy, duc de Saint-Simon, in her widowhood Catherine secretly married him, despite the earl being a lifelong Protestant.

He died without issue on 19 April 1709 and was buried in the Savoy, in the Strand (London); but his remains were moved on 21 March 1740 to Westminster Abbey.

References 

|-

1641 births
1709 deaths
British Life Guards officers
Huguenots
French marquesses
French emigrants to the Kingdom of England
Lord-Lieutenants of Kent
Monmouth Rebellion
2
Garter Knights appointed by James II